Bonduelle is a French company producing processed vegetables.

History

 The company was founded in 1853, when Louis Bonduelle-Dalle (23 October 1802 - 13 November 1880) and Louis Lesaffre-Roussel (1802–1869) established a grain and juniper berry distillery in Marquette-lez-Lille. On June 17, 1862, they expanded to a farm in Renescure, which they turned into a grain alcohol distillery.
 1901 the company and its seven production sites were divided into three family owned companies: Bonduelle, Lesaffre and Lemaître.
 1926 the business began canning peas. Demand in the 1930s enabled the company to expand, but the firm's operations were suspended in 1940 through the end of World War II.
 The mid 1960s, the company began to improve its exports, and in 1968, began freezing vegetables. Several European subsidiaries were launched: in Germany in 1969, in Italy in 1972 and in England in 1973. By 1973, exports accounted for half of the company's turnover.
 1980, Bonduelle acquired Belgian canned food company, Marie Thumas, and purchased Cassegrain in 1989.
 The company continued to grow internationally, adding subsidiaries in Brazil in 1994 and in Argentina in 1996.
 1997, the company entered the "fresh processed" business with the acquisition of Salade Minute.
  2004, Bonduelle Group created the Louis Bonduelle Foundation, which aims to promote the public usefulness of vegetables by putting the benefits of vegetables to the public good.
 2007, Bonduelle completed its acquisition of Canadian firm Aliments Carrière (Arctic Gardens brand), a leader in vegetables and frozen foods, which enabled gave it access to 39,500 hectares of farmland.
 2010, Bonduelle bought France Champignon, a leading European mushroom company.
 2011, Bonduelle inaugurated the San Paolo d’Argon plant in Italy, the largest packaged green salad production site. Bonduelle took over the Kelet Food assets in Hungary and the Cecab Group assets in Russia. In the United States, Bonduelle bought 3 frozen food plants and a packaging site from the Allens Group.
 2017, Bonduelle acquired Ready Pac Foods, an American based manufacturer of food products featuring fresh produce.
 April 2018, the company announced Guillaume Debrosse as the new CEO.

Controversies

Russian Operations

In a press release originally published on March 17, 2022, Bonduelle stated on their website that they would continue to operate in Russia but that the company will "dedicate all of our profits from sales in Russia to the future reconstruction of Ukraine".

On December 24, 2022, social media reports from members of NAFO (group) pointed to Bonduelle's Eurasia CEO, Ekaterina Eliseeva having authorised the sending of 10,000 "holiday boxes" with canned corn and peas to Russian military at the frontlines, along with a message wishing the Russian forces “a speedy victory”. Alleged photos showing the gifts would originate from the Russian city of Yartsevo's Russian social network site on VKontakte. French human rights freelance journalist Stéphane Kenech would investigate the pictures and show how Bonduelle's food makes it to frontline Russian soldiers operating in Ukraine. 

On December 31, 2022, Bonduelle would issue a response to the allegations claiming them as "fake", stating that Russian social media was spreading misleading information and that Bonduelle would continue to operate in Russia.

Link to Russia's Federal Intelligence Service
On December 31, 2022, Twitter users identified a 2019 Forbes Russia article showing that Bonduelle's Eurasia CEO, Ekaterina Eliseeva had previously attended and received translator training at the FSB Academy and graduated in 1995. The company has responded that the allegations against its management are false.

Brands
 Bonduelle (France, Italy, Germany, Brazil, Poland, Hungary, Czech Republic)
 Cassegrain (France)
 Globus (ex-CEI)
 Arctic Gardens  (Canada)
 Del Monte (Canada) (processed fruit and vegetables only)
 Ready Pac Foods (US)

Financial data

 9,569 full-time equivalent employees in 2013/2014
 48 industrial sites
 100,000 hectares cultivated by 3,440 farmers under contract.
 Canned goods make up 51% of turnover, fresh vegetables (including the line of ready-to-eat products)account for 22% and frozen foods account for the remaining 27% of the company's sales turnover.

Stock market data
 Shares traded on the Paris Stock Exchange
 Member of the CAC Mid & Small, CAC All Shares, CAC All Tradable
 ISIN code = FR0000063935
 Face value = Euro
 Shareholder breakdown:
 General partners 27.63%
 Others members of Bonduelle family 24.75%
 Public 38.80%
 Employees and treasury shares 8.81%

Governance
The following served as officers of the company:
 Chief Executive Officer: Guillaume Debrosse
 Non-Executive Chairman: Christophe Bonduelle
 Director, Bonduelle Development: Benoît Bonduelle
 Director of External Relations and Sustainable Development: Jean-Bernard Bonduelle
 Human Resources Director: Bruno Rauwel
 Administrative and Financial Director: Grégory Sanson
 Director, Bonduelle Long Life Europe : Philippe Carreau
 Director, Bonduelle Americas: Daniel Vielfaure
 Director, Bonduelle Fresh Europe: Pascal Bredeloux

References

External links
 Homepage of Bonduelle group
 Bonduelle Youtube Channel
 Louis Bonduelle Foundation

Food product brands
Food and drink companies of France
French brands
Villeneuve-d'Ascq
Companies based in Hauts-de-France
Food and drink companies established in 1853
1853 establishments in France
Companies listed on Euronext Paris